The Verband Christlicher Pfadfinderinnen und Pfadfinder (roughly: Association of Christian Guides and Scouts, VCP) is a German Protestant coed Scouting and Guiding association. According to the VCP, the organization has about 47,000 members.

It is a member of the Ring deutscher Pfadfinderverbände (Federation of German Scouting Associations, RdP), which in turn is a member of the World Organization of the Scout Movement (WOSM), and a member of the Ring Deutscher Pfadfinderinnenverbände (Federation of German Guiding Associations, RDP), which in turn is a member of the World Association of Girl Guides and Girl Scouts (WAGGGS).

History 
The association was formed in 1973 through the merger of three Protestant associations:
 Bund Christlicher Pfadfinderinnen (founded in 1922; only in Bavaria; girls only)
 Christliche Pfadfinderschaft Deutschlands (first groups in 1910, founded in 1921; boys only until 1969)
 Evangelischer Mädchen-Pfadfinderbund (founded in 1926; not in Bavaria; girls only)

In 1976, some traditional Scouting groups left and formed a separate association, using the former name Christliche Pfadfinderschaft Deutschlands again.

Two years later, the VCP held his first national jamboree. Since then, roughly every four years a national jamboree has taken place:
 1978 - Kirchberg, near Koblenz
 1984 - Eschwege
 1988 - Ruhpolding
 1992 - Ferschweiler Plateau, near Trier
 1998 - Rheinsberg in Brandenburg
 2002 - Rehau, near Nuremberg
 2006 - Großzerlang, near Rheinsberg in Brandenburg
 2010 - Wolfsburg
 2014 - Schachen, near Münsingen in  Baden-Württemberg
 2017 - Wittenberg

In 1990, after the fall of the Berlin Wall, the first groups of Protestant Scouts and Guides were formed in the still existent German Democratic Republic. Today, the VCP is present in all Federal States of Germany.

Program 
The association is divided in three age-groups:
 Kinderstufe - Cub Scouts (ages 7 to 10)
 Pfadfinderstufe - Scouts (ages 10 to 15)
Jungpfadfinderinnen and Jungpfadfinder (ages 10 to 13)
Pfadfinderinnen and Pfadfinder (ages 13 to 16)
 Roverstufe - Rover Scouts (ages 16 to 20)

The age-groups can be identified by their scarfs. Cubs wear scarfs with orange stripes, Jungpfadfinder with light green stripes, Pfadfinder scarfs with dark green stripes and Ranger/Rover scarfs with bordeaux-red stripes.

There is also a special branch for adults in Scouting, the Erwachsenenarbeit, which aims at all members older than 21 years including leaders and non-leaders. They wear scarfs with purple stripes.

Like most German Scout associations, the VCP emphasizes on youth leadership. Most patrol leaders start at 16 and most leaders up to district level are younger than 25.

Promise 
The VCP has no common Scout Promise. Its constitution proposes the following text, but other wordings are possible:
Im Vertrauen auf Gottes Hilfe
will ich christliche Pfadfinderin/christlicher Pfadfinder sein
und nach unseren Regeln mit euch leben.

Trusting on the help of God
I want to be a Christian Scout/Christian Guide
and to live with you according to our rules.

Rules 
The association has no common Scout Law. It uses Scout rules, which should be formulated individually by each group. The constitution proposes a number of points, which should go into these rules. Despite this, many subdivisions of the association use a common Scout Law.

Scout centres 
The VCP runs two national Scout centres:
 Rieneck Castle in Lower Franconia, near Würzburg
 VCP-Bundeszeltplatz (National Campground of the VCP) in Großzerlang near Rheinsberg in Brandenburg
as well as a number of regional Scout centres mostly maintained by subnational divisions of the association.

Rieneck Castle was leased by the Christliche Pfadfinderschaft Deutschlands in 1959 and bought in 1967. It is mainly used for training courses on national level, and the annual International Creative Workshop (IMWe). The VCP-Bundeszeltplatz was bought in 1997 and hosts camps from group to national level.

International Creative Workshop 
The International Creative Workshop (German: Internationale Musische Werkstatt (IMWe)) is an annual Scouting and Guiding event run by the VCP. It usually takes place at Rieneck Castle. As a Wood Badge training event, the aim of IMWe is to give leaders of Guide and Scout groups the opportunity to explore their creative talents in a relaxed setting. IMWe is prepared on behalf of the VCP by an international group of scouts who meet several times a year to organize the workshop, which is held around Easter. The workshop lasts for 8 or 9 days, with a symbolic framework or theme. Participants have to be aged 17 years or older. IMWe has been represented at international Scouting events such as EuroJam 2005 and World Scout Moot in 2015.

See also 
 Scouting in Germany

References

External links 
 
 IMWe homepage

Scouting and Guiding in Germany
World Association of Girl Guides and Girl Scouts member organizations
World Organization of the Scout Movement member organizations
Youth organizations established in 1973